Malpas may refer to:

Places

France
Malpas, Doubs, a commune in the Doubs department
Malpas Tunnel, a tunnel on the Canal du Midi

United Kingdom
Malpas, Cheshire, north-west England
Malpas, Cornwall, south-west England
Malpas, Newport, south-east Wales

Other uses
Malpas (surname), people with the name
MALPAS Software Static Analysis Toolset for safety critical applications